The desert delma (Delma desmosa) is a species of lizard in the Pygopodidae family endemic to Australia.

References

Pygopodids of Australia
Delma
Reptiles described in 2007
Endemic fauna of Australia